Louis Anthony "Bobby" Manna (born December 2, 1929, in Hoboken, New Jersey), is an American mobster and former consigliere of the Genovese crime family operating with the family's New Jersey faction.

Genovese family
Manna was a close associate of family boss Vincent "the Chin" Gigante; he rented an apartment in Greenwich Village, New York to be close to Gigante's headquarters at the Triangle Social Club. However, Manna's power base was in New Jersey. He is the brother-in-law of Genovese crime family mob associate Gerald Dirazzo. He supervised four caporegimes while also serving as consigliere. He ran his personal criminal operations out of an Italian eatery called Casella's at 615 First Street in Hoboken, New Jersey. Manna became the lead man for the Genovese family in discussions with the Gambino crime family on how to equitably divide up that area.

Gambino family
In 1987, Manna began pushing the Genovese family to murder John Gotti, the new boss of the Gambino family. A Gambino capo, Gotti had arranged the murder of Gambino boss Paul Castellano in 1985 and taken control of the Gambino family without the approval of The Commission. Manna was especially unhappy about Gotti's unsanctioned coup against Castellano. In addition, Gotti wanted to take the lucrative South Jersey holdings that used to belong to the Philadelphia crime family and leave the less desirable North Jersey territory to the Genovese family.

Conviction

Between August 1987 and January 1988, the Federal Bureau of Investigation recorded 12 conversations in which Manna and other Genovese mobsters discussed murdering John Gotti, Gene Gotti, and New York contractor Irwin Schiff. While discussing the John Gotti murder, Manna advised the hitman to wear a disguise as the target area was fairly open. On August 8, 1987, Schiff was shot in the head while dining in a Manhattan restaurant.  Manna was later indicted and on June 26, 1989, Manna was convicted of conspiring to murder John Gotti, Gene Gotti, and Irwin Schiff in aid of racketeering. On September 26, 1989, Judge Maryanne Trump-Barry sentenced Manna to 80 years in federal prison.

It was revealed by the FBI in 2004 that prior to Manna's sentencing he was involved in a murder plot of Judge Maryanne Trump Barry, the United States Attorney Samuel A. Alito and Chief Prosecutor Michael Chertoff.

In December 2020, the 91-year old Manna requested compassionate release, but was denied. He was denied release again in November 2021.

As of December 2021, Manna is incarcerated at the Federal Medical Center (FMC) in Rochester, Minnesota. His projected release date is November 7, 2054.

References

External links
La Cosa Nostra – State of New Jersey Commission of Investigation 1989 Report The Genovese/Gigante Family

1929 births
American gangsters of Italian descent
Genovese crime family
Living people
Consiglieri
People convicted of racketeering